Baby is the nickname of:

 Baby Arizmendi (1914–1962), Mexican featherweight world boxing champion
 Baby Consuelo (born 1952), Brazilian singer, guitarist and composer
 Baby Dalupan (born 1923), former Philippine Basketball Association coach and player
 Baby Dodds (1898–1959), American jazz drummer
 Baby Ray (1914–1986), American National Football League player
 Baby Tate (1916–1972), American Piedmont blues guitarist
 Baby Washington (born 1940), American soul and R&B singer
 Dave "Baby" Cortez (born 1938), American pop and R&B organist and pianist
 Princess Beatrice of the United Kingdom (1857–1944), youngest daughter of Queen Victoria
 Rafael Araújo (basketball) (born 1980), Brazilian professional basketball player

See also
 
 
 Baby Halder (born 1973), Indian writer
 Baby Huwae (1939–1989), Indonesian actress and singer
 Baby (surname)
 Baby (disambiguation)
 Babe (disambiguation)

Lists of people by nickname